This Side Up is the first studio album by Danish singer Jon Nørgaard under the name Jon. The album was released in 2002 and reissued in an international edition in 2003. It entered the Norwegian Albums Chart at number 1. The album sold 135,000 copies and resulted in two successful singles "Right Here Next to You" and "This Side Up".

Track listing

Charts and sales

Charts

Sales

Release history

References

2011 debut albums
Jon Nørgaard albums